The 2015–16 LNB Pro A season was the 94th season of the LNB Pro A. The season started on October 3, 2015 and ended June 14, 2016.

Monaco and Antibes Sharks were newcomers this season. Limoges CSP was the defending champion. ASVEL took the title, after beating Strasbourg IG 3–2 in the Finals.

Teams

Promotion and relegation
Bourg-en-Bresse and Boulogne-sur-Mer were relegated after the two teams finished in 17th and 18th place last season. Monaco was promoted after they won the 2014–15 Pro B, and Antibes Sharks were promoted as the Pro B Playoffs winners.

2015–16 teams

Regular season

League table

Playoffs

Statistical leaders
After the end of the Regular Season.

Points

|}

| width=50% valign=top |

Assists

|}
|}

Awards

All-Star Game
The All-Star Game was played on December 30, 2015 and was played at the Bercy Arena in Paris. Andrew Albicy was named the All-Star Game MVP.

See also
2016 Leaders Cup
2015–16 French Basketball Cup

References

LNB Pro A seasons
French
LNB Pro A